The nineteenth season of Deutschland sucht den Superstar began on 22 January 2022 on RTL. The jury consisted of Florian Silbereisen, Ilse DeLange and Toby Gad. The contract with Dieter Bohlen as a juror was not extended by RTL and after 18 seasons Bohlen was not in the jury. Marco Schreyl became the new host.

Guest judges in the first live show was Thomas Anders, in the second live show Sarah Lombardi, in the third and fourth Let's Dance judge Joachim Llambi.

Harry Marcello Laffontien won the competition with 73,10% of the public votes which it's the 3rd highest percentage win on the show.

Finalists

Live shows
Color key

Week 1: Top 10 - 1980s songs
Original airdate: 16 April

 Pre-voting

Week 2: Top 8 - Movie Night
Original airdate: 23 April

Week 3 - Semi-Final: Top 6 - The Power of Love
Original airdate: 30 April

Week 4 - Final: Top 4 - Season Highlight Song/favourite Song/Winner's Single
Original airdate: 7 May

Elimination chart

References

External links 
 Official website

Season 19
2022 in German music
2022 German television seasons